Mayo is a census-designated place (CDP) in Anne Arundel County, Maryland, United States. The population was 8,298 at the 2010 census. The Mayo CDP of 2010 includes all of the area that used to be counted as the Selby-on-the-Bay CDP. The beach in Mayo used to be a popular weekend resort.

Geography
It occupies a peninsula between the South River to the northeast and the Rhode River to the southwest, both of which are tidal arms of Chesapeake Bay. It is bordered by the CDP of Edgewater to the northwest, and (across the South River) by the CDP of Annapolis Neck to the northeast. Saunder's Point, Shoreham Beach, Beverly Beach, Cloverlea, Turkey Point, Holly Hill Harbor, Selby Beach, and Cape Loch Haven are some of the neighborhoods found in Mayo.

Maryland Route 214 is the main road through the center of the CDP, coming to its eastern end in Beverly Beach on Chesapeake Bay.

Demographics

2010 Census

2000 Census
As of the census of 2000, there were 3,153 people, 1,195 households, and 862 families residing in the CDP. The racial makeup of the CDP was 96.32% White, 1.27% African American, 0.51% Native American, 0.67% Asian, 0.03% Pacific Islander, 0.19% from other races, and 1.01% from two or more races. Hispanic or Latino of any race were 1.78% of the population.

There were 1,195 households, out of which 33.2% had children under the age of 18 living with them, 61.6% were married couples living together, 6.5% had a female householder with no husband present, and 27.8% were non-families. 20.7% of all households were made up of individuals, and 6.5% had someone living alone who was 65 years of age or older. The average household size was 2.64 and the average family size was 3.06.

In the CDP, the population was spread out, with 25.0% under the age of 18, 5.3% from 18 to 24, 32.0% from 25 to 44, 26.4% from 45 to 64, and 11.3% who were 65 years of age or older. The median age was 38 years. For every 100 females, there were 99.2 males. For every 100 females age 18 and over, there were 98.2 males.

The median income for a household in the CDP was $70,909, and the median income for a family was $81,634. Males had a median income of $47,500 versus $36,450 for females. The per capita income for the CDP was $30,552. About 1.8% of families and 2.8% of the population were below the poverty line, including 3.1% of those under age 18 and 3.1% of those age 65 or over.

History
Mayo takes its name from Commodore Isaac Mayo, who distinguished himself in the Mexican–American War. Commodore Mayo held a large tract of land on the South River, known in the early 1900s as "Mayo's Neck", that had been the home estate of Captain Nicholas Gassaway, the son of Maryland politician Colonel Nicholas Gassaway. His home, known as Gresham, was listed on the National Register of Historic Places in 1990.

Notable people
Jacob Bender, American football player
Phillip D. Bissett, American politician,  MD House of Delegates

References

Census-designated places in Anne Arundel County, Maryland
Census-designated places in Maryland
Maryland populated places on the Chesapeake Bay